Lucio Demare (1906–1974) was an Argentine composer who worked on a number of film scores. He was the brother of the film director Lucas Demare, and scored several of his films.

Selected filmography
Prisoners of the Earth (1939)
The Gaucho Priest (1941)
The Gaucho War (1942)
His Best Student (1944)
Savage Pampas (1945)
Behind a Long Wall (1958)

References

Bibliography
Finkielman, Jorge. The Film Industry in Argentina: An Illustrated Cultural History. McFarland, 2003.

External links

1906 births
1974 deaths
20th-century composers
Argentine composers
People from Buenos Aires